"Comas Sola" may refer to:

Astronomy
 Asteroid 1655 Comas Solà
 Josep Comas i Solà (1868-1937), Spanish astronomer
 Comet 32P/Comas Solà
 Crater Comas Sola (crater)

Music
 "Fly and Collision of Comas Sola", a song by Tangerine Dream from the album Alpha Centauri